Le Club Omnisports des Ulis is a French association football club based in Les Ulis, Essonne, founded in 1977. They are currently playing in the Championnat National 3, the fifth tier of the French football league system. They play at the Stade Salinier, named after Jean-Marc Salinier, a local politician from the area, in Les Ulis. CO Les Ulis is primarily known for being the club where France national team members Patrice Evra and Thierry Henry began their careers. The club has also developed emerging youth prospects, such as Anthony Martial, Yaya Sanogo and Sega Keita.

History
CO Les Ulis was formed relatively late, primarily due to the commune of Les Ulis also coming into existence late. Both the city and the club formed in 1977 with the commune coming into existence in February and the club being formed in May. After only 8 years of existence, the club had already developed eight sections of sport, which had over 1,000 members associated with football being the most popular in the club. By 2005, these numbers rose to over 36 sections of sport with 3,600 members.

CO Les Ulis honours are minimal with the club slowly ascending the French football league system since achieving promotion from the Division d'Excellence during the 1994–95 season. The club is currently playing in the Division Honneur of the Île-de-France region after achieving promotion from the Division Supérieure Régionale during the 2009–10 season.

Players

Current squad

References

External links
  

Les Ulis
Association football clubs established in 1977
1977 establishments in France
Les Ulis
Les Ulis